Tajuria arida, the Ceylon indigo royal, is  a species of lycaenid or blue butterfly. Once classified as a subspecies of Tajuria jehana, it is endemic to Sri Lanka.

Wingspan is about 24–26 mm. Sexes similar on dorsal aspects. Generally a silver colored butterfly. On the ventral side, there is a prominent broken sub marginal black line in male.

References 

Tajuria
Butterflies described in 1923
Butterflies of Sri Lanka
Butterflies of Asia